Wu Yongwen (born June 1952) is a Chinese politician who spent most of his career in Hubei province. As of January 2013 he was under investigation by the Communist Party of China's anti-corruption agency. Previously he served as the Vice Chairman of the Hubei Provincial People's Congress.

Chinese media reported that he had close relations with Zhou Yongkang, former Secretary of the Central Political and Legal Affairs Commission.

Life and career
Wu was born and raised in Jingmen, Hubei. He began his political career in August 1968, and joined the Communist Party of China in January 1975. He spent five years teaching at schools before serving in various administrative and political roles in Jingmen. In December 1997, he was appointed the vice-mayor of Jingmen, and then Deputy Communist Party Secretary, beginning in June 2000.

From March 2006 to September 2007, he served as the Communist Party Secretary of Ezhou, the top political position in the city.

In September 2007, he was appointed the Secretary of CPC Hubei Provincial Committee for Political and Legal Affairs; he remained in that position until July 2012, when he was appointed the deputy director of the Standing Committee of Hubei Provincial People's Congress.

On January 20, 2013, he was being investigated by the Party's internal disciplinary body; he was suspected to have been involved in trading political favours for money and for keeping mistresses. As of 2015, no further announcements have been made about Wu since he was detained.

References

1952 births
Chinese Communist Party politicians from Hubei
Living people
Political office-holders in Hubei
Central China Normal University alumni
People's Republic of China politicians from Hubei
Chinese police officers
Politicians from Jingmen